Clément-Joseph Hannouche (27 March 1950 – 9 April 2020) was an Egyptian Syriac Catholic hiearch, Bishop of Cairo since 1995.

Hannouche was born in Egypt and was ordained to the priesthood in 1976. He served as bishop of the Syriac Catholic Eparchy of Cairo, Egypt, from 1996 until his death in 2020. He also had jurisdiction in the Syriac Catholic Patriarchal Dependency of Sudan and South Sudan.

Notes

1950 births
2020 deaths
Egyptian Eastern Catholics
Syriac Catholic bishops
Eastern Catholic bishops in Africa